Christopher Campbell is a former American political aide and senior government official who previously served as Assistant Secretary of the Treasury for Financial Institutions. He was unanimously confirmed as Assistant Secretary  by the United States Senate in 2017. Prior to assuming his Department of Treasury role, Campbell was the majority staff director for the United States Senate Committee on Finance and a staffer on the United States Senate Committee on the Judiciary.

Early career 
Chris successfully consulted on a handful of winning U.S. political campaigns for candidates for federal office including several campaigns for former U.S. Senator Orrin Hatch.    Additionally Chris owned a business-consulting firm that specialized in business strategy with clients from all sized companies, from all regions of the country, and from a wide variety of industries.

U.S. Senate 
Chris was the majority staff director to the U.S. Senate Committee on Finance. He designed, managed, and coordinated the U.S. Senate Republican agenda in the areas of international and domestic taxation, international trade, Medicare (United States), Medicaid, Social Security, the U.S. National Debt, and oversight of three presidential cabinet secretaries. He was named by Roll Call Newspaper as one of the 50 most influential staffers on Capitol Hill seven years running and recognized as a bipartisan problem-solver. Previously, he served as legislative director to former U.S. Senator Orrin G. Hatch, where he coordinated and managed the senator's legislative activities.

U.S. Treasury 
Chris was unanimously confirmed by the US Senate to serve as the Assistant Secretary of the Treasury for Financial Institutions from 2017 to 2018. In that role, he was responsible for coordinating the department's efforts regarding financial institutions legislation and regulation, legislation affecting Federal agencies that regulate or insure financial institutions and securities markets legislation and regulation. Specific policy and program areas of oversight included government-sponsored enterprises, critical infrastructure protection (cyber security) and compliance policy, the Federal Insurance Office (FIO), and small business, community development, and affordable housing policy. Chris was the Treasury board representative on the boards of the Pension Benefit Guarantee Corporation (PBGC) and the Financial Industry's Critical Infrastructure Group.  Chris regularly met with the heads of the 15 federal financial regulators. Chris oversaw the Deputy Assistant Secretaries for Financial Institutions Policy and Small Business, Community Development and Affordable Housing, and Cyber Security in addition to a staff of 200.

Post-Treasury 
Christopher Campbell is the Chief Policy Strategist at Kroll, based in Miami.  Chris is a frequent television commentator on issues impacting the economy. Additionally Chris is a director of tZERO, Intrado, WEconnect Health Management, Bitt and is a Board Advisor to CrossRiver Bank. Chris is an Professor of Practice at his alma mater, Thunderbird School of Global Management. He also serves as a strategic advisor and consultant to several large national and international organizations. He is a member of the Council on Foreign Relations.

Media appearances 
Chris Campbell regularly appears on economically geared media outlets and on American cable news programs. He is regularly called upon to serve as a commentator on the media and economy on network news shows as well as CNN, Fox News Channel, CNBC, Bloomberg and the BBC among others. He has also published economic commentary in exclusive venues, such as Fox News.  Appearances include: CNBC's Squwak Box, CNBC's Worldwide Exchange, Cheddar TV and many more.

References

Living people
California Republicans
University of California, Santa Barbara alumni
Thunderbird School of Global Management alumni
Trump administration personnel
People from Hemet, California
United States Assistant Secretaries of the Treasury
Year of birth missing (living people)